Cumberland is a town in Cumberland County, Maine. The population was 8,473 at the time of the 2020 census. It is part of the Portland metropolitan area, Maine. Cumberland is one of the wealthiest municipalities in the state.

History

Cumberland, Maine (also known as Cumberland Center), was once part of North Yarmouth, but in 1821, it was incorporated as its own town. The town was officially named by Ephraim Sturdivant when the new town government elected him to do the task.

The Cumberland Fair, one of the state's larger agricultural fairs, has been held yearly in Cumberland at the end of September since 1868. This Portland suburb has a rich farming history, but only a small number of working farms remain, such as Sweetser's Apple Barrel & Orchards, Spring Brook Farms, and Double T Orchards. Chebeague Island, long a part of Cumberland, formed its own town in 2007.

Geography
The town stretches inland from Cumberland Foreside, on Casco Bay, to West Cumberland, which borders Windham.

Near the center of the town, there is a small recreational park called Twin Brook. Run and maintained by the town, it is open to cross-country skiers, walkers, and sports practices. Local ballfields at Drowne Road School host the local Little League teams. Knight's Pond Preserve on the border with North Yarmouth is home to a pond and a large nature preserve used for recreation year round.

Cumberland has a few small businesses, some of which are on Route 26, also called the Gray Road. Across Main Street from the high school, there is a convenience store called Food Stop. New construction has brought two eateries to the town, Cumberland Food Company and Louie's Grille. There are also two dentists' offices and a post office. A new bank was built in 2010. The Cumberland Congregational Church is located in the center of the town.

Demographics

2010 census
As of the census of 2010, there were 7,211 people, 2,697 households, and 2,079 families living in the town. The racial makeup of the town was 97.2% White, 0.5% African American, 0.2% Native American, 0.8% Asian, 0.3% from other races, and 1.0% from two or more races. Hispanic or Latino of any race were 1.2% of the population.

There were 2,697 households, of which 37.9% had men under the age of 18 living with them, 67.4% were married couples living together, 6.5% had a female householder with no husband present, 3.2% had a male householder with no wife present, and 22.9% were non-families. 18.9% of all households were made up of individuals, and 9% had someone living alone who was 65 years of age or older. The average household size was 2.67 and the average family size was 3.06.

The median age in the town was 45 years. 26.9% of residents were under the age of 18; 4.7% were between the ages of 18 and 24; 18.2% were from 25 to 44; 35.6% were from 45 to 64; and 14.5% were 65 years of age or older. The gender makeup of the town was 47.8% male and 52.2% female.

2000 census
As of the census of 2000, there were 7,159 people, 2,548 households, and 2,046 families living in the town. The racial makeup of the town was 98.76% White, 0.14% African American, 0.10% Native American, 0.42% Asian, 0.01% Pacific Islander, 0.13% from other races, and 0.45% from two or more races. Hispanic or Latino of any race were 0.66% of the population.

There were 2,548 households, of which 42.3% had children under the age of 18 living with them; 71.0% were married couples living together; 7.1% had a female householder with no husband present; and 19.7% were non-families. 15.7% of all households were made up of individuals, and 7.2% had someone 65 or older living alone. The average household size was 2.80 and the average family size was 3.14.

In the town, the population was spread out, with 30.4% under the age of 18; 3.6% from 18 to 24; 27.7% from 25 to 44; 27.3% from 45 to 64, and 11.0% who were 65 or older. The median age was 39 years. For every 100 females, there were 93.3 males. For every 100 females age 18 and over, there were 91.4 males.

The median income for a household in the town was $67,556, and the median income for a family was $76,571. Males had a median income of $49,538 versus $37,367 for females. The per capita income for the town was $33,644. About 2.4% of families and 3.0% of the population were below the poverty line, including 0.8% of those under age 18 and 6.2% of those age 65 or over.

Education

The school system that serves Cumberland is known as Maine School Administrative District 51 or MSAD 51. There are 3 schools in the district—which also serves North Yarmouth, Maine: the Mabel I. Wilson School, Greely Middle School, and Greely High School. In June 2014, the district closed the North Yarmouth Memorial School and moved into the expanded the Greely Middle School. The Drowne Road School was closed in 2010 due to budget cuts, and the Greely Middle School replaced the Greely Junior High School in 2005. Jeff Porter is the superintendent of the district. The Friends School of Portland, serves grades Pre-K–8.

Notable people 

 Matt Apuzzo, 2012 Pulitzer Prize-winning journalist
 Peter Askim, composer of modern classical music, conductor, music educator
 Joseph Brackett, American songwriter and elder of the Shakers; author of "Simple Gifts"
 Robert G. Dillenback, state legislator
 Toni Fiore, celebrity chef
 William J. Garsoe, state legislator and Maine House Minority Leader
 Hoddy Hildreth, state legislator and conservationist
 Captain Reuben Merrill, sea captain
 Stephen Moriarty, state legislator and attorney
D. P. B. Pride, politician and attorney in Idaho
 Captain Ephraim Sturdivant, namer of and treasurer for Cumberland
 Karl Turner, state legislator
 Oliver Wahlstrom, Professional hockey player, raised in Cumberland

References

External links
Official town website

 
Towns in Cumberland County, Maine
Portland metropolitan area, Maine
Towns in Maine